Pennsbury School District is located in Bucks County, Pennsylvania, in the United States.  The district serves Falls Township, Lower Makefield Township,  Yardley Borough, and Tullytown Borough. For the 2019-2020 school year, there were 10,257 students enrolled in the district with a final budget of $216,719,362. There was a total of 1,580 administrative, professional and support staff.

Schools

There are 15 public schools in Pennsbury School District:

Governance

Administration 
Thomas A. Smith, Ed.D.; District Superintendent
Theresa Ricci, Ed.D.; Assistant Superintendent
Chris Berdnik; Chief Financial Officer
Cherrissa Gibson, Ed.D.; Acting Director of Human Resources
Laurie Ruffing; Director of Pupil Services
Regina Rausch; Director of Special Education
Michele Spack; Director of Elementary Education
Timothy McCleary; Director of Technology
George Steill; Director of Facilities
Bob Burns; Special Education Supervisor
Amanda Caputo; Special Education Supervisor
Peter Carfagno; Special Education Supervisor
Alida Fitzpatrick; Special Education Supervisor
Stephanie Fuhrer; Special Education Supervisor
Matt Levin; Special Education Supervisor
Nicole Siler-Pastman; Special Education Supervisor
Alison Smith, Ph.D.; Special Education Supervisor
Milagro Aleman; Director of Transportation
Tom McGee; Instructional Technology Supervisor
Ashley Belcher Dowd; Food Service Director

School Board 
The Board is composed of nine residents with voting power, each elected for a four-year term. The current school board is: 
 T.R. Kannan; President 
 Gary Sanderson; Vice President 
 Linda Palsky; Assistant Secretary
 Dr. Jeannine Delwiche
 Lois Lambing
 Jim Prokopiak
 Dr. Joanna Steere 
 Chip Taylor
 Joshua Waldorf

History

2005 teachers' strike

In 2005, the Pennsbury School District experienced a teachers's strike that generated significant regional coverage by the media. After voting down a tentative contract agreement, the leadership of the Pennsbury Education Association (PEA), the union to which all of Pennsbury's teachers belong, was authorized by its members to strike on October 24, 2005. The strike lasted a total of 21 days, the maximum allowed by Pennsylvania state law, and students went back to class on November 22, 2005. According to both the PEA and the school board, salary and health benefits were the main issues. Teachers objected to having to pay more for their health insurance, and wanted to see teacher salaries stay competitive with neighboring school districts. Both sides entered non-binding arbitration on November 22, 2005, as mandated by state law, and posted their final offers on December 6, 2005. In January 2006, teachers and the school board reached a resolution and the contract was accepted.

Demographics

The district is about 82% White, 6% Black, 5% Asian and 5% Hispanic. Almost 91% of students speak only English at home. Press reports indicate that 98% of the district's teachers are White.

External links

Music

Pennsbury Instrumental Music - official website

Sports

Pennsbury Falcons Cheerleading Association - official website 
Pennsbury boys' lacrosse teams - official website
Pennsbury Regional Basketball League - official website
Pennsbury Athletic Hall of Fame - official website
Pennsbury Athletic Association - official website

Miscellaneous
Pennsylvania Department of Education Academic Achievement Report for the Pennsbury School District

References

School districts in Bucks County, Pennsylvania
School districts established in 1948